The Galactic Empire is an interstellar empire featured in Isaac Asimov's Robot, Galactic Empire, and Foundation series. The Empire is spread across the Milky Way galaxy and consists of almost 25 million planets settled exclusively by humans. For over 12 millennia the seat of imperial authority was located on the ecumenopolis of Trantor, whose population exceeded 40 billion, until it was sacked in the year 12,328. The official symbol of the empire is the Spaceship-and-Sun. Cleon II was the last Emperor to hold significant authority. The fall of the empire, modelled on the fall of the Roman Empire, is the subject of many of Asimov's novels.

Background
Asimov created the fictional Galactic Empire in the early 1940s based upon the Roman Empire, as a proposal to John W. Campbell, after reading Edward Gibbon's The History of the Decline and Fall of the Roman Empire when he was working at the Philadelphia Navy Yard with Robert Heinlein. The concept evolved through short stories and novellas in Astounding Science Fiction magazine during the 1940s, culminating in the publication of the Foundation stories as a trilogy of books in the early 1950s.

As of 827 G.E. (Galactic Era, the number of years after its founding), the Galactic Empire comprises millions of inhabited worlds with 500 quadrillion residents. According to the Foundation series chronology established in the late 1990s, it comes into existence approximately 10,000 CE, year one of the Galactic Era. (The establishment of the Empire was originally 34,500 CE, according to Asimov's unofficial unpublished early 1950s chronology.) The Galactic Empire was made possible by the ability of humans to travel through hyperspace. The space navy of the Galactic Empire is called the "Imperial Navy". The empire's capital, named Trantor, is the closest habitable planet to the center of the galaxy, and the novels in the Foundation trilogy describe its fall, over a period of centuries, and a period of anarchy and decay, a parallel to the fall of the Western Roman Empire and the Dark Ages.

Asimov posits that two foundations are instituted to restore the empire to its former glory.  Through the use of psychohistory, a future science hypothesized by Asimov, a scientist on Trantor named Hari Seldon in about 12,000 Galactic Era predicts the fall of the empire, and institutes the two foundations.

The Periphery 
The Periphery is a fictional location in Isaac Asimov's Foundation series and refers to the outer rims of the Galactic Empire, including planets such as Anacreon and Santanni. Imperial control is weakest in the periphery, as planet governors there frequently possess their own fleets. Santanni revolts during Forward the Foundation. About 50 years after the First Foundation is established on Terminus, the emperor will grant the periphery autonomy. This effectively removes them completely from Imperial control, making the dissolution of the Empire far more apparent than it had been before.

In the years preceding the fall of Trantor, the periphery became any area outside the Empire. As this area became larger the Empire became less and less great.

As the Empire decreased in size and power, the stagnation that would ultimately cause the collapse of the Empire increased.

Emperors 
A complete list of Galactic emperors and their dynasties does not exist; however, a number of names and their rule are known:

Consensus cosmogony 
Asimov's Galactic Empire was the first example after Olaf Stapledon's 1937 science fiction novel Star Maker of one of the eight stages of a "consensus cosmogony".  This is also called the Science Fiction Cosmology, identified by Donald A. Wollheim in the 1950s. Science fiction writers needed only hint at this cosmogony in their stories for experienced SF readers to slot into their perception of future history and envisage the background to the tale, without the writers needing to expend time and space explicitly explaining it.  These stages are:
The initial exploration, colonization, and exploitation of the solar system, including plots modeled on the American War of Independence where the human colonies on Mars, Venus, or other planets declare independence from Earth
The first flights to the stars, with plots similar to those of the preceding stage
The rise of a galactic empire, and possible contact, either friendly or hostile, with empires of alien species (in Asimov's Galactic Empire, only one intelligent nonhuman race is found; it leaves the galaxy in "Blind Alley")
The Galactic Empire at its height, with exploration occurring at its Rim
The Decline and Fall of the Galactic Empire, as explored by Asimov and later other authors
The Galactic Dark Ages, an interregnum with worlds reverting to barbarism, as also partially explored by Asimov
The Galactic Renaissance, where a new democratic Galactic Civilization arises, including the restoration of civilization to and communication with worlds that were isolated during the Fall—this stage was called by Stapledon the Galactic Community of Worlds, was called by Asimov the Foundation Federation, and is most commonly called by most authors the Galactic Federation
The Challenge to God, an effort to solve the last secrets of the universe by transcending matter and morphing into beings of pure energy, the end of time, and the investigation of the beginnings of new universes—Stapledon covers this in the last part of Star Maker and Asimov covers it in his short story ”The Last Question”.

Trantor

Trantor is a fictional planet depicted as the capital of the first Galactic Empire. Trantor was first mentioned in Asimov's short story "Black Friar of the Flame", later collected in The Early Asimov, Volume 1. It was described as a human-settled planet in the part of the galaxy not ruled by an intelligent reptilian race (later defeated). Later, Trantor gained prominence when the 1940s Foundation series first appeared in print (in the form of short stories). Asimov described Trantor as being in the center of the galaxy. In later stories he acknowledged the growth in astronomical knowledge by retconning its position to be as close to the Galactic Center as was compatible with human habitability.  (In reality at the galactic center is a very massive black hole and radio source known as Sagittarius A and humans could not possibly live there.)  The first time Trantor was acknowledged in novel form was in Pebble in the Sky.

Trantor represents several different aspects of civilization: it is both the center of power in the galaxy and its administrative headquarters. It is also an illustration of what could eventually happen to any urbanized planet. Asimov used the Roman Empire as the creative basis for the Foundation series, so Trantor is in some sense based on Rome at the height of the Roman Empire.

Geography and history
The earlier history of Trantor is recapitulated in The Currents of Space, mentioning the five worlds of the Trantorian Republic growing into the Trantorian Confederation and then Trantorian Empire (evidently modeled on the Roman Republic, originally ruling only part of central Italy, developing into the vast Roman Empire).

At the time when Currents takes place, Trantor controls about half of the worlds in the Galaxy, while the other half is divided into innumerable independent worlds and miniature empires – which naturally makes a Trantorian Ambassador a person of great consequence on any of the still-independent worlds. Later on, conquest of the entire galaxy made the Galactic Empire, with Trantor as its capital planet, a reality; the planet no longer sending out ambassadors, but only royal governors to subject worlds. This situation had already existed for thousands of years at the time of Pebble in the Sky, the next chronological book on this timeline.

Its surface of 194,000,000 km (75,000,000 sq mi, approx. 40% of Earth's surface area), implying a radius of around 4000 km (somewhere in between the Earth and Mars), was, with the exception of the Imperial Palace, entirely enclosed in artificial domes. It consisted of an enormous metropolis (an ecumenopolis) that stretched deep underground, and was home to a population of 45,000,000,000 (45 billion) human inhabitants at its height (although Second Foundation mentions a figure ten times that of administrators alone), a population density of 232 per square kilometre (600 per square mile), similar to the current population density of Germany or Connecticut. Its population was devoted almost entirely to either administration of the Empire or to maintenance of the planet itself, including energy provided by "heatsinks" (geothermal core taps) and production of food via underground farming and yeasts, as described in Prelude to Foundation.

The Encyclopedia Galactica states further on Trantor: "As the centre of the Imperial Government for unbroken hundreds of generations and located, as it was, toward the central regions of the Galaxy among the most densely populated and industrially advanced worlds of the system, it could scarcely help being the densest and richest clot of humanity the Race had ever seen."

A Trantorian day lasted 1.08 Galactic Standard Days.

One of the prominent features of Trantor was the Library of Trantor (variously referred to as the Imperial Library, the University of Trantor Library, and the Galactic Library), in which librarians index the entirety of human knowledge by walking up to a different computer terminal every day and resuming where the previous librarian left off.

Near Trantor were twenty agricultural worlds which supplied food which the world-city could not grow for itself, and the "Summer Planets", where the Emperor went for vacation.
Around 260 FE, a rebel leader named Gilmer attempted a coup, in the process sacking Trantor and forcing the Imperial family to flee to the nearby world of Delicass, renamed Neotrantor.  After the sack, the population dwindled rapidly from 40 billion to less than 100 million.  Most of the buildings on Trantor were destroyed during the sack, and over the course of the next two centuries the metal on Trantor was gradually sold off, as farmers uncovered more and more soil to use in their farms. Eventually the farmers grew to become the sole recognised inhabitants of the planet, and the era of Trantor as the central world of the galaxy came to a close. It began to develop a dialect very different from Galactic Standard Speech, and the people unofficially renamed their planet "Hame", or "home".

As revealed to the reader at the end of Second Foundation, not all these farmers were what they seemed, with the now-rustic Trantor serving as the centre of the Second Foundation. From Trantor, the Second Foundationers secretly guided the development of the Galaxy (roughly parallel to the city of Rome becoming, after the fall of its empire, the headquarters of the Papacy, with its enormous influence on the development of Medieval Europe). Indeed, their self-perception as leaders of the future Second Empire is captured in the Second Foundationers' use of the word "Hamish" to describe the farmers despite reserving for themselves use of the word "Trantorian". It is noted that it was the Second Foundation which ensured that the famed library would survive the sacking of Trantor and the destruction of its urban culture – especially significant, considering that the library was vital to the Second Foundation itself.

In the Asimov canon, where events of this time are depicted mainly from a Foundation perspective, the Fall of Trantor is mentioned only as a piece of faraway news and in various later short references. However, Harry Turtledove attempted to fill in the details in his "Trantor Falls", focusing on the efforts by the Second Foundation to survive during the sacking of Trantor (published in the 1989 Foundation's Friends, where various writers took up the Foundation universe).

Food production
According to the original Foundation Trilogy (1951), Asimov states (by way of the Encyclopedia Galactica), "the impossibility of proper administration ... under the uninspired leadership of the later Emperors was a considerable factor in the Fall." To support the needs and whims of the population, food from twenty agricultural worlds brought by ships in the tens of thousands, fleets greater than any navy ever constructed by the Empire. "Its dependence upon the outer worlds for food and, indeed, for all necessities of life, made Trantor increasingly vulnerable to conquest by siege. In the last millennium of the Empire, the monotonously numerous revolts made Emperor after Emperor conscious of this, and Imperial policy became little more than the protection of Trantor's delicate jugular vein" (Encyclopedia Galactica).

In Prelude to Foundation (1989), Asimov indicates that this was not always so: originally, most of Trantor's basic food needs were fulfilled by Trantor's "vast microorganism farms". Yeast vats and algae farms produced basic nutrients, which were then processed with artificial flavors into palatable food. The subterranean farms, however, depended entirely on care provided by tik-toks (lesser robots), and their destruction following an abortive uprising (chronicled in Foundation's Fear) left the Imperial capital largely dependent upon food brought from other worlds. Foundation's Edge mentions algae growing on Trantor, which is called a totally inadequate source of food, so it is possible some of the later Emperors attempted to rectify the situation with limited success. Trantor is, of course, again able to produce its own food after the sack by Gilmer, with the increasing amount of usable land as the metal on the surface was removed and sold.

Races on Trantor
Although by 22,500 years in the future, there had been much racial intermarriage and most people were multiracial, according to Asimov, in the Galactic Empire as a whole as well as on Trantor itself,  there were still some recognizable populations primarily descended from the original races on Earth.  What we call Caucasians were called Westerners, what we call East Asians were called Easterners, and what we call Black people were called Southerners.  No one could remember why these names were used because no one remembered human origins on Earth. Seldon himself openly wondered why there were no "Northerners".

Administrative sectors
The known sectors are:

Dahl—One of the poorer sections of Trantor.  The main job of the lower class is heatsinking, where workers supervise the conversion of heat from the planet's core directly into electric power by sinking extremely long rods into the inner core of the planet (the three other major sources of electric power were hydroelectric dams on the underground rivers, fusion energy, and solar energy from Trantor's sun, both from rooftop solar arrays and from solar energy satellites orbiting Trantor that  beamed microwave energy to the surface); 'heatsinkers' were generally looked down upon by other Dahlites, though they were better paid than anyone in Dahl due to their difficult working conditions. Naturally, most Dahlites hated the Empire and its soldiers (colloquially labelled 'sunbadgers'). Dahlites were black-haired, and fairly short; males wore large, thick mustaches, considered a sign of virility, and all carried knives (considered to be primitive weapons). Rather than using 'Mr.', 'Mrs.', or 'Dr.', as forms of address, Dahlites always used 'Master' and 'Mistress' (never 'Doctor'). Known Dahlites: Yugo Amaryl, Mother Rittah, Raych Seldon, Jirad and Casilia Tisalver.
Billibotton—A slum in Dahl, on the lower level.  This was where Mother Rittah lived, and where Hari Seldon and Dors Venabili met their future adoptive son, Raych Seldon.  Billibotton was (in)famous for its complete lawlessness. Without the help of Dors, Seldon never would have left it alive.
Ery—The sector in which Wanda Seldon and Stettin Palver met Bor Alurin.
Imperial—The sector in which the Imperial Palace and the Galactic Library lie. When Seldon first visited Trantor to deliver his speech at the Decennial Convention, fashion in the sector called for bold, bright colors and wearing hats without chinstraps.
Mandanov
Millimaru—The sector Raych claimed to be (and maybe was) born in when he infiltrated the Joranumite movement.
Mycogen— As Asimov explains in Prelude to Foundation, their name is formed from the Greek stems myco- (meaning 'yeast' or other types of fungi) and -gen (meaning 'maker' or 'producer'), which matches the description of Mycogen as specialized in breeding and exporting yeast, or "microfood", to other portions of Trantor. It kept the best for itself; the food eaten by Seldon in Mycogen was the best he had ever had on Trantor.  Mycogenians were descendants of the ancient Spacer world Aurora (also mentioned in The Naked Sun) and lamented the loss of their ancient homeworld and culture, including robots.  They lived by a strict religion they considered to be 'history'. The scripture of the Mycogenians mentions Aurora, robots, and other topics, and during the events of Prelude to Foundation Hari Seldon found a long-inactive robot, which was revered by the Mycogenians. The 'high priest' was the leader of the council of elders, the government of Mycogen. During an adolescent rite of passage, all Mycogenians were completely depilated, so they could differentiate between themselves and non-Mycogenians. Because hair is considered so repulsive, most Mycogenians are repelled by its appearance and rare foreign visitors must wear skincaps at all times. The sight and feel of hair was considered similar to pornography by Mycogenians. By tradition they usually wear a cloak called a 'kirtle'; men always wear a white kirtle, women a gray one. Mycogenian names are organised by 'cohort', and individuals are numbered as part of a series. Known Mycogenians: Mycelium 72, Raindrop 43, Raindrop 45, Sunmaster 14, Skystrip 2.
Nevrask— One of the last sectors to hold out against Gilmer during the Great Sack
North Damiano— A sector with a prominent University, involved in co-operative Nephelometry with Streeling University. North Damiano University operates Jet-downs equipped with sensory electronics.
Streeling—At the time Hari Seldon first arrived on Trantor, fashions in Streeling were not quite so boldly colorful as in the Imperial Sector. It was the site of Streeling University, a prestigious university noted for being almost completely out of the hands of the Empire. It later gained fame for housing Hari Seldon and his "Seldon Psychohistory Project".
Wye—The hereditary Mayoralty of the sector of Wye are the descendants of the ancient Dacian Dynasty of Emperors. Located by the South Pole, Wye exercised a good deal of political power, because it was the site where excess heat across the planet was released. If it shut down those systems, the heat would build up and destroy Trantor. During the time of Seldon's flight, Wye was preparing an army for a coup. This action was stopped by Eto Demerzel, and the military of Wye disbanded. Known Wyans: Mayor Mannix IV, Mayor Rashelle I.
Ziggoreth— A sector with a prominent University. Ziggoreth University is involved in co-operative Nephelometric research with Streeling University, and operates Jet-downs equipped with sensory electronics.

Retroactive continuity
 In the original Foundation Trilogy, there is no indication of Trantor being divided among wildly diverse cultures; likewise, the surface is described as covered with towers rather than domes.  Its depiction in Prelude to Foundation and Forward the Foundation may be considered another example of retconning.
 Although some have been confused by the apparent conflict between Trantorian self-sufficiency in terms of food supply in Prelude and the subsequent characterization in Encyclopedia Galactica of the planet as dependent upon twenty agricultural worlds for food, there is no conflict. Prelude depicts an earlier period of Imperial history, and as subsequently explained in Foundation's Fear, the food situation on Trantor changed precisely because its subterranean farms were shut down in the wake of the abortive tik-tok rebellion. That book directly establishes that it was this decision that made Trantor dependent on the produce of twenty agricultural worlds—ironically, the same worlds over which Neotrantor would hold its last, feeble sway.

Other authors and Asimov's universe
Bondanella (listed in Further reading) analyzes Asimov's Galactic Empire as an example of the influence of the myth and history of the Roman Empire upon modern fiction.  Asimov himself wrote two non-fiction books on the subject of the Roman Empire, aimed at the mass market and young readerships, The Roman Republic in 1966 and The Roman Empire in 1967, reflecting the positive view of the Roman Empire that then prevailed, as it was considered the prototype of the rising American Empire.

After the cinematic release of the first Star Wars trilogy, another parallel to the Roman Empire that presents the negative view of the empire that became widely prevalent in late 20th and early 21st century popular culture as a result of the negative view of the American Empire resulting from the Vietnam War, Asimov revisited his Galactic Empire and wrote further novels in the Foundation series.

Other writers to have been influenced by the Roman Empire include, of course, those who have written novels set in Asimov's universe of the Galactic Empire, such as David Brin's Foundation's Triumph, and Robert Silverberg, who wrote of an alternative universe in which the Roman Empire never fell, and who edited Far Horizons (listed in Further reading) which contains several examples of Asimov's influence upon science fiction. Brian Herbert's and Kevin J. Anderson's Dune: House Atreides (1999) is, similarly, a Greek parallel to ancient Rome.

Other works to have been influenced by Asimov's Empire include Donald Kingsbury's Psychohistorical Crisis, whose galactic empire, and the scholar-empire that succeeds it, are clearly based upon Asimov's Galactic Empire and the Foundations, albeit that Kingsbury was not granted permission to set his work directly in Asimov's universe.  Seed calls this work "perhaps the most remarkable homage that any SF writer has received from another SF writer".

Asimov's Galactic Empire, its decline, fall, and rebirth, in particular, is characterized by Perelman as a simple repetition of the history of Western Civilization from the fall of the Roman Empire to the 20th century, borrowing freely from Toynbee, and a validation of postwar American culture of the 1940s and 1950s, with the Second Galactic Empire being "definitely suburban".

Other writers to explore the cycles of civilisations in their works include James Blish, who studied the works of Oswald Spengler and whose novel Cities in Flight (which includes 4 novels: They Shall Have Stars, A Life for the Stars, Earthman Come Home, and The Triumph of Time) portray the rise and fall of the galaxy as an inevitable cycle, of which (unlike in other dystopian SF stories of the 1940s and 1950s) the use of machine technology is merely a symptom not the actual cause, and culminate, as in Wollheim's eighth stage, with the end of the universe and the birth of a new one.

Colin Manlove characterizes Asimov's description of the Galactic Empire, its people, its culture, its history, and its planets, laid out in the Foundation novels as an aesthetic monotony: "persons are usually seen as typical rather than special, even as clichés … the mutant Mule […] is not given a personality, he is merely a powerful anomaly … Nor do we hear much of landscapes, apart from Trantor and one sea-scape … we do not know how one planet differs from another, as, say, Ursula K. Le Guin differentiates the desert Anarres from the lush twin Urras … Nor are we given details of battles, lingering accounts of love, different customs of civilisations.  There are no animals, only man.  …  Thought-processes and conversations largely fill the trilogy, and nearly all these are confined to finding things out and with gaining power."

Inspired by Trantor
There have been some serious attempts to illustrate a planet like Trantor in the Star Wars films by George Lucas, the first being Coruscant. Coruscant is a planet-covering open-air city, while Trantor's buildings are all subterranean or under domes due to worsening weather conditions. Asimov's Trantor thus differs from Coruscant in that Trantor is more practically adapted to inclement weather, although weather control devices are used on both planets.

The planet Helior in Harry Harrison's Bill, the Galactic Hero satirises Trantor, highlighting the problems of atmosphere, waste disposal and navigating about a world-sized city.

In the Runaway series of adventure games, Trantor is home planet of this universe's alien species. However, no connection besides the name are made to the original.

"TrantorCon 23309" was proposed by Larry Niven at Worldcon in 1976.

The Warhammer 40,000 sources mention dead cities upon the quarantine planet of Proxima Trantor.

Weber's World, the administration planet of the United Planets in the Legion of Super-Heroes's time, is an ecumenopolis and said to be in the Trantor system.

In the Bobiverse series, one of the human colony planets is named Trantor by Howard, in an explicitly stated homage to the Foundation series (though the planet is initially misspelled by an official who did not recognise the reference).

Primary sources

References

Further reading 
 
 
 
 
 

Foundation universe
Galactic empires
Ecumenopolises